National Highway 727 (NH 727) is a  National Highway in India.

References

National highways in India